Everald La Ronde (born 24 January 1963) is an English former footballer who played as a defender.

La Ronde started his career at West Ham where he was captain of the team which won the 1981 Youth Cup Final. He played only 7 times for West Ham before signing for Bournemouth in September 1983. Arguably his most notable game for Bournemouth came on 7 January 1984 when he was part of the team which knocked Manchester United out of the FA Cup.

After an injury hit period amounting to only 24 games he completed a loan spell with Peterborough United before problems with his knee, stomach and hernia forced him to retire.

He also coached in Saudi Arabia.

References

External links
 

1963 births
Living people
Footballers from East Ham
English footballers
Association football fullbacks
West Ham United F.C. players
AFC Bournemouth players
Peterborough United F.C. players
English Football League players
Black British sportspeople
English expatriates in Saudi Arabia